Cristián Arturo Sánchez Barceló (born 29 May 1972, Concepción) is a Chilean journalist and television presenter.

Personal life 
Sánchez is married to Diana Bolocco, a Chilean journalist and TV presenter who is the younger sister of Cecilia Bolocco, the Miss Universe 1987, and the mother of Pedro Cisternas, a professional footballer.

He is the second of seven brothers: Matías, the eldest; José Manuel or Coto; Jaime, a psychologist who also works in TV; Aníbal, deceased in 2021; Felipe or Pipe, a businessman who also worked in TV and Juan Pablo.

A well-known supporter of Colo-Colo, he was a young football player of Cobresal youth ranks in 1989. He has stated that he dreamed of being a professional footballer, so when joined TV program ESPN Nexo, later ESPN FShow, where he performs as presenter and sports commentator, he returned to his roots, since he had also worked as sports journalist in his early career on TV.

Filmography

Television

Cinema

References

External links 
 

1972 births
Living people
Chilean people of Catalan descent
People from Concepción, Chile
Male journalists
Chilean journalists
Chilean television personalities
Chilean television presenters
Chilean sports journalists
Chilean association football commentators
Chilean radio personalities